Hirschsprung or Hirschprung may refer to:

Places in Germany
 Hirschsprung, Germany, a village in the eastern Ore Mountains in Saxony
 Hirschsprung (Black Forest), a crag above the Höllental gorge in the Black Forest

People
 Harald Hirschsprung (1830–1916), Danish physician
 Heinrich Hirschsprung (1836–1908), Danish tobacco manufacturer, arts patron and art collector
 Pinhas Hirschprung (1912–1998), rabbi

Other
 The Hirschsprung Collection, an art museum in Copenhagen, Denmark
 Hirschsprung's disease, which involves an aganglionic section of bowel